Splinten Peak is one of the Seilkopf Peaks, standing just north of Pilarryggen in the Borg Massif of Queen Maud Land. Mapped by Norwegian cartographers from surveys and air photos by Norwegian-British-Swedish Antarctic Expedition (NBSAE) (1949–52) and named Splinten (the splinter).

References

Mountains of Queen Maud Land
Princess Martha Coast